Xenesis is a 2004 techno-thriller by Beat Glogger, a Swiss science journalist, published by Rowohlt Verlag. The book builds around a theme of livestock that are genetically modified for xenotransplantation, as a remedy for human organ donor shortages. A film adaptation may be in progress.

The title combines the Greek words "xenos" ("alien") and "genesis" ("beginning" or "creation").

Awards
The book was awarded the Media Prix in 2005 by the Swiss Academy of Natural Sciences and was nominated for the 2006 Descartes Prize by the European Commission.

References

External links
https://web.archive.org/web/20080101212615/http://www.medical-thriller.de/beat_glogger.html

2004 novels
Swiss science fiction novels
Techno-thriller novels
Rowohlt Verlag books